Leonora Ruffo (13 January 1935 – 25 May 2007) was an Italian film actress.

Career
Born in Rome as Bruna Bovi, the daughter of Angelo Bovi, basketball coach of Ginnastica Roma, Italian Championship pluri-winner, Ruffo failed to obtain the main roles in Cielo sulla palude by Augusto Genina and Tomorrow Is Another Day by Léonide Moguy due to the opposition of her family. She eventually debuted in 1951 in Gli amanti di Ravello by Francesco De Robertis.

She was almost entirely active in peplum and adventure films; an exception is her role as the sensible Sandra Rubini in Federico Fellini's I Vitelloni.

She retired from acting in the late 1960s.

Ruffo also starred in a number of fotoromanzi, usually being credited as Bruna Falchi or with the stage name Ingrid Swenson.
She was married to Italian producer Ermanno Curti, and had two sons Stefano and Gianluca. She was the aunt of Claudia Mori.

Filmography

References

External links 

 

1935 births
Italian film actresses
Italian television actresses
Actresses from Rome
2007 deaths